The World Figure Skating Championships is an annual figure skating competition sanctioned by the International Skating Union in which figure skaters compete for the title of World Champion.

Men and pairs competitions took place from February 17th to 19th in Budapest, Hungary. Ladies' competitions took place from February 11th to 12th in Prague, Czechoslovakia.

These World Figure Skating Championships were the last before World War II. The Austrian skaters Edi Rada, Emmy Puzinger, Anita Wägeler, Ilse Pausin / Erich Pausin, and the judge Dr. H. Deistler represented Germany. The former Austrian skater Herbert Alward represented Hungary.

Results

Men

Judges:
 Herbert J. Clarke 
 J. Kowalski 
 Fritz Schober 
 Andor Szende 
 A. Winkler

Ladies

Judges:
 Herbert J. Clarke 
 H. Deistler 
 A. Huber 
 J. Hainz 
 Charles Sabouret

Pairs

Judges:
 E. Bedetto 
 J. Kowalski 
 Ethel Muckelt 
 P. Weiss 
 A. Winkler 
 C. Witt 
 O. Zöllner

Sources
 Result List provided by the ISU

World Figure Skating Championships
World Figure Skating Championships
World Figure Skating Championships
International figure skating competitions hosted by Czechoslovakia
International figure skating competitions hosted by Hungary
1939 in Hungarian sport
1930s in Budapest
1930s in Prague
February 1939 sports events